The 2020 Summer Olympics women's street skateboarding competition occurred on 26 July 2021 at Ariake Urban Sports Park in Tokyo, Japan.

It was originally scheduled to be held in 2020, but on 24 March 2020, the Olympics were postponed to 2021 due to the COVID-19 pandemic. 

Momiji Nishiya of Japan won the gold medal, with Rayssa Leal of Brazil and Funa Nakayama of the Japan winning the silver and bronze medals.

Qualification 

 3 from the World Championships
 16 from the World Olympic Rankings
 1 host nation place

Competition format 
All 20 skateboarders did two 45-second runs, and then five single tricks rounds. Only the top 4 scores from the seven rounds for each skateboarder counted toward the final score. The top 8 skateboarders from the Semi-Final qualified for the finals, where the scores were reset and follow the same two 45 second round and five single trick round format.

Results

Semifinals 
The top 8 skateboarders of 20 advanced to the finals.

Final 
Source:

See also
Skateboarding at the 2020 Summer Olympics
Skateboarding at the 2020 Summer Olympics – Men's street
Skateboarding at the 2020 Summer Olympics – Women's park

References 

Skateboarding at the 2020 Summer Olympics
Women's events at the 2020 Summer Olympics